The first round of the Acre gubernatorial election was held on 5 October 2014 to elect the next governor of the state of Acre.  No candidate won 50% of the vote and thus a second-round runoff election was held on 26 October.  Governor Tião Viana was re-elected for a second term.

Candidates
Tião Viana 13 (PT) - incumbent Governor (elected in 2010); former Senator (1999-2010)
Nazareth Lambert 13 (PT)
Bocalom 25 (DEM) - former Mayor of Acrelândia (elected in 1992, 2000, 2004)
Henrique Afonso 25 (PV) - Federal Deputy (elected in 2002, 2006, 2010); former City Councillor, Cruzeiro do Sul (elected in 1996)
Márcio Bittar 45 (PSDB) - Federal Deputy (elected in 1998, 2010)
Antonia Sales 45 (PMDB) - State Deputy (elected in 2010)
Antonio Rocha 50 (PSOL)
Dany Mendonça 50 (PSOL)

Coalitions

Opinion Polling

Results

External links
 Bocalom Campaign Website
 Marcio Bittar Campaign Website

References

2014 Brazilian gubernatorial elections
October 2014 events in South America
2014